Little Orbit the Astrodog and the Screechers from Outer Space is a 1979 French animated science fiction film directed by Jean Image. It is based on the 1972 TV series Arago X-001.

The film is also known in English as Pluk in Cosmos and Pluk in the Space.

Plot 

Pluk, an extraterrestrial robot endowed with extraordinary strength, is stranded on Earth. He befriends the boy genius Niki, his girlfriend Babette and Niki's smart dog Jupiter. They all leave Earth in Niki's spacecraft l'Arago X-001, searching for Pluk's ship Le Cosmos. They stop on several planets before reaching Plukastre, the home planet of Pluk.

References

External links

Pluk, naufragé de l’espace at Association française du cinéma d'animation. Retrieved 2 August 2009

1979 films
1979 animated films
1970s science fiction films
Films directed by Jean Image
French animated science fiction films
1970s French-language films
Robot films
1970s French animated films